Scott City is a city in and the county seat of Scott County, Kansas, United States.  As of the 2020 census, the population of the city was 4,113.

History

Early history

For millennia, the Great Plains of North America were inhabited by nomadic Native Americans.  From the 16th to 18th centuries, the Kingdom of France claimed ownership of large parts of North America.  In 1762, after the French and Indian War, France secretly ceded New France to Spain, by the Treaty of Fontainebleau.

19th century
In 1802, Spain returned most of the land to France, keeping title to about 7,500 square miles. In 1803, most of the land for modern day Kansas was acquired by the United States from France as part of the 828,000 square mile Louisiana Purchase. In 1854, the Kansas Territory was organized under the provisions of the Kansas–Nebraska Act, then in 1861 Kansas became the 34th U.S. state. In 1873, Scott County was established, which included the land for modern day Scott City.

Scott City was founded in 1885. Like Scott County, the city is named in recognition of a United States General, Winfield Scott. In October 1884, two women from Chicago, Illinois claimed the land that Scott City is on and built a cabin. The following February, two men from Chicago came to the cabin and settled. Soon after, many people started arriving in the county and Scott City was then founded in 1885. Before being founded, Mrs. M.E. De Geer, one of the women that came from Chicago, started a newspaper called the Western Times in March 1885. The county then started to fill rapidly.

Scott County was legally instituted in 1873 by an act of legislature. At this time it was named in honor of General Winfield Scott. Since it was such a small town with a small population, there was no need for a local government. Therefore, it was connected to Ford County for judicial matters.

Geography
Scott City is located at  (38.4825192, −100.9070949). It is located in the Great Plains and at the elevation of 2979 ft.

Climate
According to the Köppen Climate Classification system, Scott City has a semi-arid climate, abbreviated "BSk" on climate maps. The average temperature is 52.4 °F (11.34 °C) and has an average rain fall of 20.16 inches a year. The average snow fall for a year is 23 in. (.58 m).

Demographics

2010 census
As of the census of 2010, there were 3,816 people, 1,583 households, and 1,029 families residing in the city. The racial makeup of the city was 89.4% White, 0.4% African American, 0.5% Native American, 0.5% Asian, 7.8% from other races, and 1.4% from two or more races. Hispanics or Latinos of any race were 17.3% of the population.

There were 1,583 households, of which 29.4% had children under the age of 18 living with them, 54.0% were married couples living together, 6.3% had a female householder with no husband present, 4.7% had a male householder with no wife present, and 35.0% were non-families. 30.4% of all households were made up of individuals, and 15.8% had someone living alone who was 65 years of age or older. The average household size was 2.34 and the average family size was 2.93.

The median age in the city was 42 years. 24% of residents were under the age of 18; 7% were between the ages of 18 and 24; 22.4% were from 25 to 44; 27% were from 45 to 64; and 19.7% were 65 years of age or older. The gender makeup of the city was 49.8% male and 50.2% female.

2000 census
As of the census of 2000, there were 3,855 people, 1,595 households, and 1,060 families residing in the city. The racial makeup of the city was 95.18% White, 0.13% African American, 0.49% Native American, 0.16% Asian, 2.88% from other races, and 1.17% from two or more races. Hispanic or Latino of any race were 7.26% of the population.

There were 1,595 households, out of which 31.2% had children under the age of 18 living with them, 56.6% were married couples living together, 7.4% had a female householder with no husband present, and 33.5% were non-families. 30.5% of all households were made up of individuals, and 15.4% had someone living alone who was 65 years of age or older. The average household size was 2.36 and the average family size was 2.96.

In the city, the population was spread out, with 26.0% under the age of 18, 6.5% from 18 to 24, 25.1% from 25 to 44, 23.8% from 45 to 64, and 18.5% who were 65 years of age or older. The median age was 40 years. For every 100 females, there were 93.6 males. For every 100 females age 18 and over, there were 91.5 males.

The median income for a household in the city was $36,047 and the median income for a family was $48,750. Males had a median income of $32,287 versus $19,900 for females. The per capita income for the city was $19,227. About 2.8% of families and 6.8% of the population were below the poverty line, including 8.5% of those under age 18 and 9.8% of those age 65 or over.

Economy
The top employers are:
 Agriculture
 Healthcare
 Education

Government
Scott City is governed by a mayor and a city council that are elected by the residents of Scott City. The mayor and city council make up the governing body and control the government affairs of the city. The council consists of 8 elected members. The mayor serves for 2 years and the council members serve for 4. The current mayor is Everett Green (2017-).

Education

The community is served by Scott County USD 466 public school district.  The mascot is the beaver, and a giant welded beaver is on display at the football field.

Arts and Culture
The El Quartelejo Museum and the Jerry Thomas Gallery and Collection are co-located in the city. Their collections cover much of the region's geologic, Indian, and pioneer history. The Gallery also contains artwork by Jerry Thomas, an artist originally from Scott City. Many of the paintings are inspired by local history or artifacts in the collection.  The Apache and Puebloan site, El Cuartelejo (also spelled El Quartelejo), can be found in the eastern section of Lake Scott State Park.

Annual Events
The Scott County Free Fair is an annual event held in Scott City. There is a livestock show as well as many events.

The Whimmydiddle Arts and Crafts Fair is held on the last Saturday of September in the Scott City Park.

Beefiesta is held yearly to celebrate the beef industry in Scott County, one of the largest cattle feeding counties in the state. The Beefiesta BBQ is held during the Scott County Free Fair. The city also hosts Beef Tasting Booths at the city park immediately following the parade.

Every July 4, a fireworks show is exhibited on the east side of town near the baseball fields. Nearby Scott County Lake also holds a fireworks show on the lake shore.

On the third weekend in August, the Lake Scott Car Club hosts the Lake Scott Rod Run.

One weekend every fall, the Sunflower Futurity and Derby is held at the Scott City Indoor Arena. Barrel Racers compete against a few hundred others. Open Barrel Race, Seniors Barrel Race, and Juniors & Pee-Wee Barrel Races are put on as well as the actual barrel races.

The annual Carp Contest is held at Lake Scott State Park one weekend during the summer months. The event is put on by the Chamber of Commerce, Lake Scott State Park, and Friends of Lake Scott.

The M.A.S.H. Golf Tournament is typically held on the second weekend in June. This tournament is limited to 18 teams and lasts for about 6 hours.

Media
The official newspaper is The Scott County Record. This weekly publication has been in business since 1993. In 2016, editor Rod Haxton was honored by the Kansas Press Association with the Clyde M. Reed Master Editor Award.

Infrastructure

Transportation 
K-96 and US-83 highways intersect the city.

The Scott City Airport is a rapidly growing mode of transportation in Scott County. In 2009, the runway was repaved and now measures 75 ft x 5002 ft. The airport is publicly owned and located on the SE side of Scott City.

Notable people
 Ron Baker, former NBA player for the New York Knicks and Washington Wizards

See also
 El Cuartelejo Apache and Puebloan site
 Northern Cheyenne Exodus

References

Further reading

External links
 
 Scott City - Directory of Public Officials
 El Quartelejo Museum - local history
 USD 466, local school district
 Scott City map, KDOT

Cities in Scott County, Kansas
Cities in Kansas
County seats in Kansas
1885 establishments in Kansas
Populated places established in 1885